William Russell (1735 – January 14, 1793) was an army officer and a prominent settler of the southwestern region of the Virginia Colony. He led an early attempt to settle the "Kentuckee Territory" (then part of Virginia). He was a justice of Fincastle County, Virginia. During the American Revolutionary War he fought in the Battle of Yorktown. While a representative in the Virginia House of Delegates, Russell was noted for his stance opposing the 1785 State of Franklin petition for admittance into the United States.

Personal life
William Russell was educated at the College of William & Mary. Russell's first wife was Tabitha Adams, who died in 1776. His second wife, Elizabeth Henry —a sister of Patrick Henry —survived him by more than thirty years. Elizabeth was important in the early history of the Methodist Church in America. Many descendants of Russell lived in Russell and Scott Counties in Virginia.

Frontiersman
Russell led an early attempt to settle the area that would become Kentucky —then part of Fincastle County, Virginia —in September 1773. The party of frontiersmen was ambushed by Native Americans and Russell's eldest son, along with the eldest son of Daniel Boone, was killed. After the battle, the party became discouraged and turned back.

Civic and military life
Russell was elected a justice of Fincastle County, Virginia. As a Virginia representative to the Continental Congress, he aided in the drafting of the Declaration of Independence . Russell was serving in the Virginia House of Delegates at the time of his death.

In Dunmore's War he participated in the 1774 Battle of Point Pleasant. He was promoted to Colonel in 1776. After the fall of Charleston during the American Revolutionary War in 1780, Russell was captured by the British and held prisoner. He was subsequently exchanged, and rejoined the Continental Line. Russell was present at the surrender of Cornwallis at Yorktown in 1781. During this time, he was brevetted to the rank of Brigadier General, commanding the 5th Virginia Regiment, until it was disbanded on 15 November 1783.
At the conclusion of the Revolutionary War in 1783 Col. Russell became an original member of the Society of the Cincinnati. ( Source; American Revolutionary Institute )

Legacy
Russell County, Virginia, and Russellville, Kentucky, are named for him.
Russell County, Kentucky, is named for his son William Russell (III).

References
 William Russell and his Descendants by Anna Russell des Cognets, Lexington, KY, 1884.
 William Russell: a Revolutionary patriot of the Clinch Valley by Mary Katherine Thorp, Master's Thesis, University of Virginia, 1936.

External links

1735 births
1793 deaths
Continental Army officers from Virginia
Members of the Virginia House of Delegates
People of Virginia in the French and Indian War
Continental Army generals
18th-century American politicians